Steven John Talboys (18 September 1966 – 31 July 2019) was an English professional footballer who played as a midfielder.

He notably played in the Premier League for Wimbledon and in the Football League for Watford, prior to this period he had an extensive career in non-league football and would return to semi-professional football after leaving Watford in 1998. Notable non-league sides include Forest Green Rovers, Bath City, Gloucester City, Aldershot Town, Sutton United and Boreham Wood.

Playing career
He was born in Bristol, England and played for a large number of clubs, mostly in non-league, but played 26 times in the FA Premier League for Wimbledon during the 1990s, and then made a small number of appearances in the third tier of English football for Watford.

He also played semi-professionally for Forest Green Rovers, Mangotsfield United, Bath City, Trowbridge Town, Aldershot Town, Gloucester City, Kingstonian, Sutton United, Paulton Rovers, Boreham Wood, Carshalton Athletic, Hampton & Richmond Borough and Staines Town.

Personal life
Talboys worked as a development executive for Aon Sports.

Death
Talboys died on 31 July 2019, aged 52, in Spain.

References

External links

Since 1888... The Searchable Premiership and Football League Player Database (subscription required)
Steve Talboys (Gloucester) statistics

1966 births
2019 deaths
English footballers
Association football midfielders
Premier League players
Forest Green Rovers F.C. players
Mangotsfield United F.C. players
Bath City F.C. players
Trowbridge Town F.C. players
Gloucester City A.F.C. players
Wimbledon F.C. players
Watford F.C. players
Aldershot Town F.C. players
Kingstonian F.C. players
Sutton United F.C. players
Paulton Rovers F.C. players
Boreham Wood F.C. players
Carshalton Athletic F.C. players
Hampton & Richmond Borough F.C. players
Staines Town F.C. players
Footballers from Bristol